This is a list of bridges and viaducts in Ukraine, including those for pedestrians and vehicular traffic.

Historical and architectural interest bridges

Major road and railway bridges 
This table presents the structures with spans greater than 200 meters (non-exhaustive list).

See also 

 Bridges in Kyiv
 List of crossings of the Dnieper
 Transport in Ukraine
 Rail transport in Ukraine
 Roads in Ukraine
 Geography of Ukraine

Notes and references 
 Notes

 

 Other references

Further reading

External links 

 
 
 

Ukraine
 
Bridges
Bridges